, also known professionally as , is a Japanese voice actress and singer. She is represented by Production Baobab. She released her first album Fantastic Voyage in 2014.

Biography
Kanemoto attended high school in Kamogata, Okayama and enrolled in the voice acting course at the vocational school of Art College in Kobe. After graduating, she moved to Tokyo and joined Production Baobab. She used her stage name Juri Aikawa. She made her anime debut under this name in Sora no Manimani, after being selected to portray Shirley by an audience vote at that spring's DreamParty Tokyo convention. In 2010, Kanemoto announced that she would be using her real name in her professional work. She made her first leading role in the anime series Sound of the Sky. She won the "Best Rookie Actress" award at the 5th Seiyu Awards.

Filmography

Anime

Original net animation

Films

Original video animation
Food Wars!: Shokugeki no Soma (Erina Nakiri)
 Baby Princess 2D Paradise 0 (Watayuki Amatsuka)
Star-Myu: High School Star Musical (2016) (Tsumugi Nayuki)
Onna no Sono no Hoshi (2022) (Mayumi Kubota)

Video games
Koumajou Densetsu II: Stranger's Requiem (2010) (Flandre Scarlet)
Otomedius Excellent (2011) (Dark Force)
Kokoro Connect Yochi Random (2012) (Yui Kiriyama)
Photo Kano (2012) (Mai Sakura)
Rune Factory 4 (2012) (Xiao Pai)
Smile PreCure! Let's Go! Marchenland (2012) (Yayoi Kise / Cure Peace)
Kantai Collection (2013) (Japanese destroyer Harusame, Hayashimo, Kiyoshimo and Hoppō Seiki)
Senran Kagura Shinovi Versus (2013) (Murakumo)
The Legend of Heroes: Trails of Cold Steel (2013) (Fie Claussell)
Granblue Fantasy (2014) (Djeeta)
Gunslinger Stratos (2014) (Kyouka Katagiri)
Super Heroine Chronicle (2014) (Meru)
The Legend of Heroes: Trails of Cold Steel II (2014) (Fie Claussell)
Senran Kagura: Bon Appétit! (Murakumo)
God Eater 2 Rage Burst (2015) (Livie Collete)
Sword Art Online: Lost Song (2015) (Seven)
Tekken 7 (2015) (Lucky Chloe)
Fire Emblem Fates (2015) (Sakura)
Lilycle Rainbow Stage!!! (2015) (Mariya Natsuki)
Senran Kagura Estival Versus (Murakumo)
Fate/Grand Order (2016) (Helena Blavatsky, Archer Inferno/Tomoe Gozen)
Girls' Frontline (2016) (Saiga-12, PzB 39)
BanG Dream! Girls Band Party! (2017) (Tsugumi Hazawa)
Accel World VS Sword Art Online (2017) (Seven)
Magia Record (2017) (Karin Misono)
The Legend of Heroes: Trails of Cold Steel III (2017) (Fie Claussell)
Azur Lane (2017) (Jintsū, Kent, Black Prince)
Senran Kagura: Peach Beach Splash (Murakumo)
Princess Connect! Re:Dive (2018) (Djeeta)
The Legend of Heroes: Trails of Cold Steel IV (2018) (Fie Claussell)
Arknights (2019) (Ptilopsis)
The Legend of Heroes: Trails into Reverie (2020) (Fie Claussell)
Blue Archive (2021) (Junko Akashi)
100% Orange Juice (2021) (Cook)
Honkai Impact 3rd (2022) (Vill-V)
Genshin Impact (2022) (Nilou)
Granblue Fantasy: Relink (2023) (Djeeta)

Dubbing

Live-action
 Begin Again – Violet Mulligan (Hailee Steinfeld)

Animation
 The Last Summoner – Flame

Discography

Albums
 Fantastic Voyage (2014)

References

External links
 Official blog 
 Official agency profile 
 

1987 births
Living people
Japanese women pop singers
Japanese video game actresses
Japanese voice actresses
Production Baobab voice actors
Voice actresses from Okayama Prefecture
21st-century Japanese actresses
21st-century Japanese women singers
21st-century Japanese singers